Things and Other Things is an album by American singer Bobby Darin, released in 1962. It reached number 45 on the Billboard 200. The single "Things" charted in the Top Five.

Background
Darin had left Atco Records for Capitol when Things and Other Things was released. The songs were taken from different sessions, some of which date back over four years."I'll Be There" was the only Darin original covered by Elvis Presley. "Theme from 'Come September'" comes from the film of the same name, which starred Darin and his future wife Sandra Dee.

The album was reissued on CD in 2003 by Collectors' Choice.

Reception

In his Allmusic review, critic Lindsay Palmer wrote "...the artist's popularity would turn this seemingly monetarily-motivated odds and sods collection into a relatively successful package for the label. The dozen songs were taken from practically as many different sessions, some of which date back over a four-year span (1958 -- 1961)... Although stylistically eclectic, the material hangs together to offer an overview of the musical diversity that had become one of his strongest suits."

Track listing
All songs by Bobby Darin unless otherwise noted.	
"Things" (1962 single) – 2:35 
"I'll Be There" (B-side of "Bill Bailey", 1960) – 2:10
"Lost Love" (Darin, Don Kirshner) (B-side of "Queen of the Hop", 1958) – 2:31
"Look For My True Love" (B-side of "Nature Boy", 1961) – 1:59
"Beachcomber" (1960 single) – 2:16
"Now We're One" (B-side of "Early in the Morning", 1958) – 2:15
"You're Mine" (B-side of "Mighty Mighty Man", 1958) – 2:09
"Oo-Ee-Train" (B-side of "Lazy River", 1960) – 2:07
"Jailer Bring Me Water" (B-side of "Things", 1962) – 2:20
"Nature Boy" (eden ahbez) (1961 single) – 2:35
"Theme From Come September" (1961 single) – 2:35
"Sorrow Tomorrow" (Doc Pomus, Mort Shuman) (B-side of "You Must Have Been a Beautiful Baby", 1961) – 2:31

Personnel
Bobby Darin – vocals, piano

References

1962 albums
Bobby Darin albums
Atco Records albums
Albums produced by Ahmet Ertegun